3-Methoxyeticyclidine (3-MeO-PCE), also known as methoxieticyclidine, is a dissociative anesthetic that is qualitatively similar to PCE and PCP and has been sold online as a designer drug.

On October 18, 2012 the Advisory Council on the Misuse of Drugs in the United Kingdom released a report about methoxetamine, saying that the "harms of methoxetamine are commensurate with Class B of the Misuse of Drugs Act (1971)", despite the fact that the act does not classify drugs based on harm. The report went on to suggest that all analogues of methoxetamine should also become class B drugs and suggested a catch-all clause covering both existing and unresearched arylcyclohexamines, including 3-MeO-PCE.

This report also described the receptor binding profile of methoxetamine and three additional dissociatives 3-MeO-PCP, 4-MeO-PCP, and 3-MeO-PCE, showing them to have significant affinity for the PCP site of the NMDA receptor (NMDAR) and was later published in more detail.

3-MeO-PCE has Ki values of 61 nM for the NMDAR, 743 nM for the dopamine transporter, 2097 nM for the histamine H2 receptor, 964 nM for the alpha-2A adrenergic receptor, 115 nM for the serotonin transporter, 4519 nM for the σ1 receptor, and 525 nM for the σ2 receptor.

Legal status 

3-MeO-PCE is banned in Sweden and Switzerland.

As per Chile's Ley de drogas, aka Ley 20000, all esters and ethers of PCE are illegal. As 3-MeO-PCE is an ether of PCE, it is thus illegal.

See also 
 3-HO-PCP
 3-MeO-PCMo
 Arylcyclohexylamine
 Ketamine
 Methoxyketamine
 Eticyclidine

References 

Arylcyclohexylamines
Dissociative drugs
O-methylated phenols
Designer drugs